Saros cycle series 130 for solar eclipses occurs at the Moon's descending node, repeating every 18 years, 11 days, containing 73 events. All eclipses in this series occurs at the Moon's descending node.

This solar saros is linked to Lunar Saros 123.

Umbral eclipses
Umbral eclipses (annular, total and hybrid) can be further classified as either: 1) Central (two limits), 2) Central (one limit) or 3) Non-Central (one limit). The statistical distribution of these classes in Saros series 130 appears in the following table.

Events

References 
 http://eclipse.gsfc.nasa.gov/SEsaros/SEsaros130.html

External links
Saros cycle 130 - Information and visualization

Solar saros series